No. 5 John Street is a 1921 British silent drama film directed by Kenelm Foss and starring Zena Dare and Mary Odette and Lionelle Howard. It is based on the 1899 novel by Richard Whiteing. The screenplay concerns a soap-making heiress who disguises herself as a worker.

Plot
A soap-making heiress disguises herself as a worker and gets employment at her own family's factory to find out about ordinary conditions. However she comes under threat from an anarchist.

Cast
 Zena Dare as Tilda  
 Mary Odette as Celia Ridler  
 Lionelle Howard as Seaton Ridler  
 Randle Ayrton as I. Azreal  
 Roy Travers as Sir Charles Pounds  
 Charles Danvers as Sir Marmaduke Ridler  
 James McWilliams as Stubbs  
 Peggy Bayfield as Nance

References

Bibliography
 Low, Rachael. History of the British Film, 1918-1929. George Allen & Unwin, 1971.

External links

1921 films
1921 drama films
British silent feature films
British drama films
Films directed by Kenelm Foss
Films based on British novels
Films set in England
British black-and-white films
1920s English-language films
1920s British films
Silent drama films